Jersey accent may refer to:

Channel Island English
New Jersey English dialects